Redemption is a 1943 Italian drama film directed by Marcello Albani and starring Carlo Tamberlani, Mario Ferrari and Camillo Pilotto. It was shot at Cinecittà Studios in Rome. Made during wartime, it is a propaganda film written by Roberto Farinacci a leading Fascist supporter of Benito Mussolini.

Synopsis
A communist deserts from the Italian Army in the closing stages of the First World War. He battles against the rise of the Fascist Party, but eventually changes sides and takes part in the March on Rome.

Main cast
 Carlo Tamberlani as Giuseppe Madidini 
 Mario Ferrari as Il segretario del fascio 
 Camillo Pilotto as Il capolega 
 Vera Carmi as Maria 
 Mino Doro as Carlo 
 Lauro Gazzolo as Tonio 
 Aroldo Tieri as Giuseppe Bongiovanni

References

Bibliography 
 Peter Bondanella & Federico Pacchioni. A History of Italian Cinema. Bloomsbury Publishing, 2017.

External links 
 

1943 films
Italian drama films
1940s Italian-language films
Films directed by Marcello Albani
Italian black-and-white films
Films shot at Cinecittà Studios
Films set in the 1910s
Films set in the 1920s
1943 drama films
1940s Italian films